Mead Township may refer to one of the following places in the United States:

 Mead Township, Merrick County, Nebraska
 Mead Township, Belmont County, Ohio
 Mead Township, Warren County, Pennsylvania

Township name disambiguation pages